Osaka Hurricane was the annual flagship professional wrestling event produced by Osaka Pro Wrestling between 2003 and 2012. The event was held during the month of February. The event was considered the biggest event of Osaka Pro. It was introduced first in 2003. Two editions of the event were held in 2004. The first edition of 2004 was the fourth Super J-Cup tournament held in Osaka while the second edition of 2004 was held in Tokyo during the month of April and was the only version of the event to be held in April and outside Osaka. The final event was held in July 2012 and then Osaka Hurricane was discontinued.

Dates and venues

Results

2003

The first Osaka Hurricane event took place on February 1, 2003 at the Osaka-jō Hall. The event was headlined by an Osaka Pro Wrestling Championship match billed as "Symbol of Osaka vs. Tennozan" in which Delfin defeated the defending champion Big Boss MA-G-MA to capture the title.

2004

Super J-Cup

The second Osaka Hurricane was held on February 21, 2004 featured the 2004 Super J-Cup tournament, featuring the best junior heavyweights in Japan and the event was aired on pay-per-view. The tournament was won by Naomichi Marufuji from Pro Wrestling Noah. The event also featured a six-man tag team match, in which Cima, Heat and Kenta defeated the veteran team of Jushin Thunder Liger, Jinsei Shinzaki and Super Delfin.

Tournament brackets

Osaka Hurricane in Tokyo

The third Osaka Hurricane event was held at Yoyogi National Gymnasium in Tokyo and was the first and only Osaka Hurricane event to be held in Tokyo and was dubbed Osaka Hurricane in Tokyo. The event took place on April 2, 2004 and marked the only time that Osaka Hurricane was held twice in a year. The event was headlined by a six-man tag team match in which Big Boss MA-G-MA, Daio QUALLT and GOA billed as Kishiwada Gurentai took on the team of New Japan Pro-Wrestling representatives Jushin Thunder Liger, Koji Kanemoto and Wataru Inoue. Kaz Hayashi defended the AJPW World Junior Heavyweight Championship against Tsubasa in the penultimate match.

2005

The fourth Osaka Hurricane was held on February 13, 2005 at the Osaka Prefectural Gymnasium in Osaka, Japan. The event was aired live on pay-per-view via "Perfect Choice" pay-per-view service. In the main event, Big Boss MA-G-MA defended the Osaka Pro Wrestling Championship against Super Dolphin, who defeated MA-G-MA to win the title. The event also featured the return of Tsubasa to action as he teamed with Jushin Thunder Liger to take on Super Delfin and The Tiger in a tag team match, which Liger and Tsubasa won.

2006

The fifth Osaka Hurricane was held on February 26, 2006 at Namiyaha Dome Sub-Arena in Kadoma, Osaka, Japan. The main event featured a match between teacher and student in which Super Dolphin defended the Osaka Pro Wrestling Championship against his trainer and mentor Super Delfin, who defeated Dolphin to capture the title.

2007

The sixth Osaka Hurricane event was held on February 12, 2007 at the Grand Cube Osaka in Osaka, Japan. In the main event, Billy Ken Kid defended the Osaka Pro Wrestling Championship against Tigers Mask, with Mask beating Kid for the title. The event also featured a special dream tag team match featuring four of the biggest junior heavyweights of Japan, pitting Super Delfin and The Great Sasuke against Gran Hamada and Último Dragón.

2008

The seventh Osaka Hurricane was held on February 11, 2008 at the Osaka Prefectural Gymnasium in Osaka, Japan. The main event was a mask vs. mask match, in which Black Buffalo defended the Osaka Pro Wrestling Championship against Tigers Mask. Billy Ken Kid made his return to action at the event by competing against Naomichi Marufuji.

2009

The eighth Osaka Hurricane was held on February 15, 2009 at the Osaka Prefectural Gymnasium in Osaka, Japan. The main event pitted Hideyoshi defending the Osaka Pro Wrestling Championship against Billy Ken Kid. Kid won the title. The Bodyguard competed in his first professional wrestling match at the event, making his in-ring debut against Zeus. The two would go on to form a tag team in future called The Big Guns, winning the Osaka Pro Wrestling Tag Team Championship multiple times and also achieving success in All Japan Pro Wrestling. The event featured comic tag team matches featuring wrestlers mimicking Antonio Inoki, Tatsumi Fujinami and Riki Choshu.

2010

The ninth Osaka Hurricane event was held on February 11, 2010 at the Osaka Prefectural Gymnasium in Osaka, Japan. In the main event, Billy Ken Kid defeated the defending champion Dick Togo in a No Disqualification match for the Osaka Pro Wrestling Championship.

2011

The tenth Osaka Hurricane event was held on August 14, 2011 at the Osaka Prefectural Gymnasium in Osaka, Japan. In the main event, Billy Ken Kid defeated Tigers Mask to capture the Osaka Pro Wrestling Championship.

2012

The eleventh and final Osaka Hurricane was held on July 22, 2012 at the Osaka Prefectural Gymnasium in Osaka, Japan. The main event was a singles match for the Osaka Pro Wrestling Championship, in which Daisuke Harada defeated the defending champion Black Buffalo to capture the title.

References

External links
Osaka Pro Wrestling official website

Professional wrestling shows
Recurring events established in 2003
Recurring events disestablished in 2011
Osaka Pro Wrestling